Ungrading: Why Rating Students Undermines Learning (and What to Do Instead) is a book on grading in education edited by Susan D. Blum, a professor of anthropology at the University of Notre Dame. The book carries a Foreword by Alfie Kohn. It includes thirteen chapters on the subject by various authors and a Conclusion chapter by Blum. According to Blum, the book addresses the topic of the "movement at this end of the second decade of the twenty-first century. I call it ungrading. Others call it de-grading or going gradeless." The book provides an understanding of why many educators now feel "grades should be eliminated from the educational system" and "brings a deep reflection into our assessment models, practices, and experiences."

References 

Books about education
2020 non-fiction books